Joseph Finder (born October 6, 1958) is an American thriller writer. His books include Paranoia, Company Man, The Fixer, Killer Instinct, Power Play, and the Nick Heller series of thrillers. His novel High Crimes was made into the film of the same name starring Ashley Judd and Morgan Freeman. His novel Paranoia was adapted into a 2013 film starring Liam Hemsworth, Gary Oldman, and Harrison Ford.

Early life
Joseph Finder was born in Chicago, Illinois in 1958 and spent much of his early childhood in Afghanistan and the Philippines before his family returned to the United States and lived in Bellingham, Washington and outside Albany, New York. Finder majored in Russian studies at Yale University, where he graduated summa cum laude and Phi Beta Kappa. He was also a bass singer in the Yale Whiffenpoofs (1980).  He received a master's degree from the Harvard Russian Research Center and later taught on the Harvard faculty. He states that "He was recruited to the 
Central Intelligence Agency but eventually decided he preferred writing fiction."

Career
Finder published Red Carpet: The Connection Between the Kremlin and America's Most Powerful Businessmen (1983), about Dr. Armand Hammer's ties to Soviet intelligence. Finder's first novel, The Moscow Club (1991), imagined a KGB coup against Soviet leader Mikhail Gorbachev. His second novel, Extraordinary Powers (1994) was about the discovery of a Soviet mole in the highest ranks of the CIA.

Paranoia (2004) was a New York Times bestseller in both hardcover and paperback, as was Company Man (2005). Finder won the 2007 International Thriller Writers Award for best novel for Killer Instinct, (St. Martin's Press), published in May 2006. Power Play, published in 2007, was nominated for a Gumshoe Award.  Vanished, the first novel to feature Finder's series character Nick Heller, was nominated for the 2010 International Thriller Writers Award for best novel. Buried Secrets, the second Nick Heller novel, won the 2011 Strand Magazine Critics Award for Best Novel, sharing the award with The Cut by George Pelecanos. Suspicion (2014) was the first book to be published under Finder's new contract with Dutton, a subsidiary of Penguin Random House; The Fixer, another standalone, followed in 2015. Guilty Minds, the third novel to feature Finder's series character, Nick Heller, was published in summer 2016. Another standalone novel, Judgment, was published in 2019. Dutton published the fourth Nick Heller novel, House on Fire, in 2020.

Finder is a founding member of the International Thriller Writers Association and served as Financial Advisor to International PEN-New England. He is also a member of the Association of Former Intelligence Officers. He writes on espionage and international affairs for publications including The New York Times and The Washington Post.

Books

Nick Heller series
 Vanished, 2009, paperback 2010
 Buried Secrets, Summer 2011
 "Plan B", 2011
 "Good and Valuable Consideration", in Faceoff , (with Jack Reacher) September 2014 (co-written with Lee Child)
 Guilty Minds, July 2016
 House on Fire, January 2020

Other novels
The Moscow Club,  paperback 1991 (out of print)
Extraordinary Powers,  paperback 1994 (out of print)
The Zero Hour,  paperback 1996 (out of print)
High Crimes,  paperback 1998
Paranoia,  paperback 2004
Company Man (retitled No Hiding Place in UK),  paperback 2005
Killer Instinct,  (hardcover) 2006
Power Play,  (hardcover) 2007
Suspicion,  (hardcover) May 27, 2014
The Fixer,  (hardcover) June 9, 2015
The Switch,  (hardcover) June 13, 2017
Judgment,  (hardcover) January 29, 2019

Nonfiction
Red Carpet: The Connection Between the Kremlin and America's Most Powerful Businessmen. New York: Holt, Rinehart & Winston (1983).

References

External links

Official website

20th-century American novelists
21st-century American novelists
American male novelists
American thriller writers
Writers from Chicago
Yale University alumni
Harvard University alumni
Harvard University faculty
Living people
1958 births
20th-century American male writers
21st-century American male writers
Novelists from Illinois
Novelists from Massachusetts
Barry Award winners